The 1815 Bali earthquake occurred on November 22 between 22:00 and 23:00 local time (WITA), affecting the Bali Kingdom. The estimated moment magnitude 7.0 earthquake struck off the north coast of Bali at a shallow depth. It was assigned a maximum intensity of IX (Violent) on the Mercalli intensity scale, causing severe damage in Buleleng and Tabanan. The earthquake caused a landslide and tsunami that killed 11,453 people.

Geology
Off the north coast of Bali is the Flores Back Arc Thrust Fault, located in the back-arc region. It formed due to the convergence between the Sunda and Australian plates, accommodating compression. The two plates converge northward at a rate of /yr, in which the Sunda megathrust takes /yr of the movement. The remaining /yr rate is accommodated by the Flores Back Arc Thrust Fault. It runs off the north coast of the Lesser Sunda Islands, in the Banda Sea. Geologists postulate the fault is divided into two segments; the -long Flores Thrust, and -long Wetar Thrust. Its origin has been attributed to several causes proposed by researchers; magmatic intrusion, gravitational sliding, reverse subduction or active spreading in the back-arc. It is a complex zone of thrust faults that are connected at depth.

Earthquake characteristics
The earthquake and tsunami is thought to be the result of a thrust fault rupture on the Flores Back Arc Thrust Fault. The fault was the source of approximately 26 magnitude 6.0+ earthquakes since 1960. These earthquakes were calculated to be at depths of up to  beneath the crust. It was also the source of the 1992 and 2018 earthquakes that caused many fatalities. The 1815 event is the oldest documented earthquake along the fault. Modelling of a moment magnitude 7.3 earthquake at  depth could produce Modified Mercalli intensity VIII–IX along the north central and eastern parts of Bali. Modified Mercalli intensity V in Surabaya corresponded to the historical descriptions of the event. On Lombok, the earthquake was felt VII.

Damage
The earthquake occurred at 10:00 p.m. local time. In Buleleng shaking was described as violent. A series of strong shocks followed and persisted for an hour. Shaking was felt in Bima, Surabaya, and Lombok. A massive "explosion" was observed along the coastal ranges. The explosion triggered a landslide which buried Singaraja and Buleleng, resulting in at least 10,253 fatalities. A large fissure was observed running through Lake Tamblingan, from Buleleng to Tabanan. It agitated the lake and caused flooding. A destructive tsunami washed onto the Balinese coast, killing an additional 1,200 people.

See also 
List of historical earthquakes
List of earthquakes in Indonesia
 1917 Bali earthquake

References

Earthquakes in Indonesia
1815 natural disasters
1815 in Indonesia
History of Bali
Tsunamis in Indonesia
1815 disasters in Asia
1815 disasters in Oceania
19th-century disasters in Indonesia